North Liberty is the name of the following places in the United States of America:

North Liberty, Indiana
North Liberty, Iowa
Keene, Kentucky, originally established as North Liberty
North Liberty, Ohio

See also
 North Liberties, barony of County Limerick in Ireland
 Northern Liberties